One More Night may refer to:

Music

Albums
 One More Night (album), a reissued 1995 album by Luv'

Songs
 "One More Night" (Cascada song), 2004
 "One More Night" (Dinah Nah song), 2017
 "One More Night" (Esther Hart song), 2003
 "One More Night" (Maroon 5 song), 2012
 "One More Night" (Phil Collins song), 1984
 "One More Night" (Sandie Shaw song), 1977
 "One More Night" (Sandra song), 1990
 "One More Night", by Amber from This Is Your Night
 "One More Night", by Bella Thorne from Jersey
 "One More Night", by Bob Dylan from Nashville Skyline
 "One More Night", by Can from Ege Bamyasi
 "One More Night", by Fleetwood Mac from Live
 "One More Night", by Helen Reddy from Ear Candy
 "One More Night", by Michael Kiwanuka from Love & Hate
 "One More Night", by New Kids on the Block from Thankful
 "One More Night", by Jordan Knight from Unfinished